Count Johan Adam Cronstedt (12 November 1749 – 21 February 1836) was a Swedish Lieutenant General and governor of Östergötland County. He joined up aged 14 and participated in the Russo-Swedish War (1788–90), but he is most notable for his part in the 1808-09 Finnish War and his command of the Savo Brigade.

1749 births
1836 deaths
Swedish Army lieutenant generals
County governors of Sweden
Swedish military personnel of the Finnish War
Commanders Grand Cross of the Order of the Sword

Johan Adam